Mesapamea is a genus of moths of the family Noctuidae.

Species
 Mesapamea arbora (Barnes & McDunnough, 1912) (syn: Mesapamea mactatoides (Barnes & McDunnough, 1912))
 Mesapamea calcirena (Püngeler, 1902)
 Mesapamea concinnata Heinicke, 1959
 Mesapamea evidentis Heinicke, 1959
 Mesapamea fractilinea (Grote, 1874)
 Mesapamea maderensis Pinker, [1971]
 Mesapamea moderata (Eversmann, 1843)
 Mesapamea monotona Heinicke, 1959
 Mesapamea pinkeri Bacallado, 1972
 Mesapamea remmi Rezbanyai-Reser, 1985
 Mesapamea secalella Remm, 1983
 Mesapamea secalindica Rezbanyai-Reser, 1986
 Mesapamea secalis (Linnaeus, 1758)
 Mesapamea storai (Rebel, [1940])

References
Natural History Museum Lepidoptera genus database
Mesapamea at funet

Hadeninae